Evanescence is the third studio album by American rock band Evanescence, released on October 7, 2011, by Wind-up Records. The band began writing the album in June 2009. Its release was delayed several times; on February 22, 2010, the band entered the studio with producer Steve Lillywhite but later stopped working with him because he "wasn't the right fit". At the time the album was scheduled for an August or September 2010 release, but Lee later announced that Evanescence had suspended recording to write more material. On April 11, 2011, the band returned to the studio with producer Nick Raskulinecz. It is the second and final studio album to feature guitarist Terry Balsamo who departed from the band in August 2015, also the first album to feature the guitarist Troy McLawhorn, bassist Tim McCord and drummer Will Hunt.

According to Lee, the band brought influences from Björk, Depeche Mode, Massive Attack, MGMT, and Portishead to the album. Evanescence songs contain sounds and influences characteristic of nu metal, hard rock, and symphonic metal. Although the album received generally positive reviews from music critics, who praised Lee's vocals and its innovative sound, some noted a similarity to the band's older material. Evanescence debuted at number one on the Billboard 200 chart with 127,000 copies sold in its first week, and topped four other Billboard charts; Rock Albums, Digital Albums, Alternative Albums, and Hard Rock Albums. The album was successful worldwide, appearing on the charts of over 20 countries. The band promoted Evanescence by premiering songs online on a number of websites and appearing on several television shows.

The first single from the album, "What You Want", was released on August 9, 2011; "My Heart Is Broken", the album's second single, was released on November 11. "Lost in Paradise" was released internationally as its third single on May 25, 2012, and "The Other Side" was serviced to US modern rock radio stations as a promotional single on June 11. In 2011 the band embarked on the Evanescence Tour, their third worldwide tour, to promote the album with The Pretty Reckless and Fair to Midland.

Background and writing
After finishing a tour to promote Evanescence's previous album, The Open Door, Amy Lee said that she "just sort of took off and didn't know what I was going to do next." According to Lee, she was unsure at the time when—or if—Evanescence would continue. After taking a break from music for 18 months, she decided she wanted to work with the band members and it "became more of a group project". Lee admitted to an identity crisis: "[The success with] Fallen happened really fast, and it was just go, go, go for a couple years, and we went right into writing and wrote the next record. By the time we finished touring with The Open Door, I just needed to go, 'Who am I as an adult? During her hiatus, Lee began painting, attended concerts and museums and listened to folk and indie music.

In a June 2009 post on the Evanescence website, Lee wrote that the band was in the process of writing material for an album planned for release the following year. According to Lee, the music would be an evolution of previous work and "better, stronger, and more interesting". She described Evanescence music as epic, dark, big, beautiful and desperate. In a Spin interview, Lee called the record "fun", which, according to her, was a "totally new thing" for the band: "When I listen to our old music I see that's where I was in my life at that time. This has been a long trip and parts have been hard. But it's about not taking everything so seriously this time."

Writing for the album began in 2009, when Lee wrote an electronic-driven song different from her usual style. She said, "I remember listening to it over and over, just obsessing over it the way I used to obsess over Evanescence music. That was the spark for me – and the spark to go in the electronic direction and bring some of that into what Evanescence is doing." Unlike the band's two previous albums (primarily written by Lee), every band member contributed to the writing process. This marks their last album with Terry Balsamo on lead guitars.

Recording and development

Evanescence entered the studio on February 22, 2010, to begin recording the album. Sessions took place in MSR Studios, New York. Will Hunt returned as drummer; a second drummer and programmer, Will "Science" Hunt, was brought in to assist with writing but did not join the band. David Campbell, who previously worked with Evanescence on The Open Door, was brought back to handle string arrangements and the album was scheduled for release by producer Steve Lillywhite. The Roots drummer Questlove contributed to drums on a song titled "You Got a Lot to Learn", but it wasn't included on the final album. Throughout March, Lee previewed two new songs on her Twitter; however, they were not included on the album. Lee said that "industrial" was a better word to describe the sound of the new album, and the band were working on about 16 songs. Lee later said that Lillywhite "wasn't the right fit", adding that the band was experimenting and when they tried to record the songs Lee wrote without the band "it wasn't working." According to Lee, the programming-driven songs written with Lillywhite did not suit Evanescence's sound.

When the band began recording with Lillywhite, the album was intended for an August or September 2010 release. Recordings were suspended in April that year. Two months later, on June 21, 2010, Lee announced on EvThreads.com that Evanescence had suspended recording to continue work on the album and "get our heads into the right creative space". According to Lee, Wind-up Records was experiencing "uncertain times" which would further delay the album's release. Label president Ed Vetri supported Lee's decision: "One thing we do at Wind-up is, we're patient. I[f] it's not right, it's not coming out. If it takes a year or four years, [we're] going to take the time it needs to write the right record." After visiting the studio several times to see the album's progress, Vetri said that "her core fans will be really happy."

When the band parted ways with Lillywhite, he said he was proud of the album he'd produced with them and revealed their label scrapped the material because they thought "it didn't sound like Evanescence."

Evanescence re-entered Blackbird Studio in Nashville in early April 2011 with 19 songs and new producer Nick Raskulinecz, who previously produced for Alice in Chains and Foo Fighters. The album was mixed by Randy Staub. After an initial denial by band management, on June 12 Lee confirmed that guitarist Troy McLawhorn had rejoined Evanescence. She also announced that the album would be released on October 4, 2011; the date was later pushed back a week by Wind-up Records. According to Lee, when the band returned to the studio, she wanted the album released as soon as possible because of the long time since Evanescence's last album. The instruments other than pianos were recorded first, followed by the pianos and then by Lee's vocals; she said the demanding songs made her "push" herself vocally. Raskulinecz's production, she said, made Evanescence a rock album. Lee appreciated his work, including the producer's willingness to answer her questions and determine when the album would be finished:
Nick is an awesome producer. He really helped me get the plan and have confidence in the decisions that we made. For me, I have a lot of ideas and sometimes it just comes down to "OK, everything that I'm doing I have two options!" He's awesome, because as I'm doing these things I'm asking him from the vocal booth or the piano room or whatever, "Which one of these should I do?" He's good at helping me make a quick decision. I really trust his opinion because he makes great records.

In December 2015, Lee posted a cover of "Baby Did a Bad Bad Thing" by Chris Isaak, which she stated was originally intended to appear on the album produced by Lillywhite in 2010. She also further explained that while three songs from the Lillywhite-produced record ultimately made it on to the final album, the record company rejected the original project. Lee said she used her frustration with being forced to start over to write what she called "(Evanescence's) heaviest album."

Title and concept
In a June 2011 Kerrang! interview, Lee said that the album would be self-titled and was "about the band; it's more of a band record." Lee explained that the concept "to me is about falling back in love with this thing, with Evanescence, with what I've obsessed over for a decade, longer than that." There were originally many album-title ideas, but Lee said that as the project became more collaborative "it just felt like this is who we are, it's a band. And to have that feeling in the music where the band is so pumped up, it was just the only title that felt right. It's about falling back in love with this thing in a major way." In an MTV News interview, she said that 16 songs had been recorded but not all would be included on the album. It was later decided to release two versions of the album: a deluxe edition with all 16 songs and a standard edition with 12.

Evanescence cover artwork was introduced on the band's website on August 30, 2011. It is their first album cover which does not feature Lee. In an interview, she discussed the cover: "Well, both of our other records are me on the cover, and I think it's cool to have that photo, you know, that people can look at and go, 'OK, that's who that is.' But I feel like, by now, they know who we are, and I wanted something really different. I didn't feel like we had to put a photo on the cover, I wanted it to be more mysterious and more about Evanescence itself, not just me." The cover, black with vapor behind the band's name, is a play on the meaning of "evanescence" ("to dissipate like vapor").

Composition

Musical style and inspiration

During the Steve Lillywhite sessions, Lee described the album as a "rainbow of sounds" with heavy, stripped-out songs. According to Lee, it had electro influences and a lot of drum programming fused with live drums, citing Taiko drums. As for the lyrical theme, she said the songs were about what she was going through at the time, and there were moments of "Hey, I'm over it and I'm good" and others of fun sarcasm, saying "everything's not the most dramatic thing in the world." She also added that there were songs that would get "really, really deep." The album's themes were unknown worlds, the ocean's abyss, life within dreams, strength, detachment, love and liars. During the later sessions with Nick Raskulincecz, she discussed two of the album's themes: brokenness ("Brokenness has become a little bit of theme, without necessarily offering a solution") and oceans. In a later MTV interview, Lee mentioned other themes: "the quest for freedom, and then there's songs that are just about falling in love". She said that Evanescence used new and vintage instruments (such as a harp, synthesizers and the Moog Taurus Pedal) and recorded the ballads "Secret Door" and "My Heart Is Broken". In a Kerrang! interview, Lee said she was inspired by her life and personal relationships.

According to Lee, the album was fun but not in a "poppy way" and the band enjoyed its recording. She was inspired by her relationship with Evanescence's fans: "I can really hear myself singing about my relationship with Evanescence and with the fans. There's always one big relationship on a record that I sing about the most. I feel like my big relationship on this album [is] with Evanescence itself, and with the fans. I think lyrically you're hearing a lot about a relationship, a struggle with a relationship or love in a relationship, and mostly I'm singing about that."

For the album, the band was influenced by artists such as Björk, Depeche Mode, Massive Attack, MGMT, and Portishead. Lewis Corner of the Digital Spy website noted that rumbling guitars and dainty strings were present on most of the album's songs: "Amy Lee declares over roaring guitars and classical strings, reinforcing their medieval influences as opposed to the electronic sound they've been purporting."

This marks the first Evanescence recording since their 1998 self titled demo to not feature backing choruses, which were introduced until the Origin demo album in 2000.

Music and lyrics
Lee shares writing credits with other members of the band on 11 of the standard-edition album's 12 songs. Evanescence first track and lead single, "What You Want", was described as one of the band's most unusual songs with heavy guitar melodies, loud drums and a freedom theme. Opening with drums and a synchronized synthesizer, Lee sings "Do what you, what you want / If you have a dream for better / Do what you, what you want / 'Til you don't want it anymore" before the song's rhythmic, guitar-driven beat. Lyrically, the song explores a relationship which is not working out, despite present love. "Made of Stone", one of the album's oldest songs, has heavy-metal influences. "The Change" (originally entitled "Purple"), which begins gently and grows more insistent, has been compared to "Digital Bath" by the American alternative metal band Deftones. The fourth track (and second single), "My Heart Is Broken", is a ballad written for harp and recorded with a piano. It begins with the piano and Lee's vocals, evolving into rhythmic guitars and strings. In the chorus Lee sings, "I will never find a way to heal my soul/ And I will wander 'til the end of time/ Torn away from you/ My heart is broken".

The fifth track, "The Other Side", has churning, chunky guitars, a double-bass drum and Lee's "ethereal, widescreen" vocals with elements of R&B. Lyrically, the song's theme is death. "Erase This", formerly titled "Vanilla", was noted by Mary Ouellette of Loudwire as an "uptempo rocker" similar to "What You Want" which would sound better played live rather than through earphones. "Lost in Paradise" is a symphonic rock ballad which begins with piano, strings and Lee's unlayered vocals before adding the band for the song's climax; its lyrics reflect Lee's past struggles, apologizing to her fans for the band's five-year absence. The song's musical structure was compared to "Jóga", by the Icelandic recording artist Björk. "Sick" has a loose, lazy melody and a chanted chorus; one of the first songs written for the album, it "set[s] a heavy direction for the rest of the record." "End of the Dream" begins "full bore with chunky guitar, then falls into a brooding grove with piano underpinning Lee's unmistakable vocals." In the chorus, Lee sings "Follow your heart 'til it bleeds," evincing the track's "seize the day" message. Lee said about the song, "It's about understanding that this life isn't forever, and how you have to live it, embrace even the pain, before it's all over. As much as it hurts, it just means you're alive. So don't be so afraid to get hurt that you miss out on living." "Oceans" begins with a big, low synth and a vocal before the band joins in. According to Lee, "It's big and lush. We've been having a lot of fun playing that one especially." "Never Go Back" (originally called "Orange") examines "loss from the perspective of someone losing someone in a tragedy". Lee said that the song, with the lyrics "It's all gone, the only world I've ever known", was inspired by the 2011 Tōhoku earthquake and tsunami. "Swimming Home" is an electro-pop song with grinding guitars and a "weeping" piano.

Release and promotion
Evanescence was first released in snippets, with portions of "What You Want", "The Other Side" and "Lost in Paradise" previewed on MTV News on July 11, 13 and 15 respectively. Several songs were made available online, including "The Other Side", which premiered on September 21 at Hot Topic; "My Heart Is Broken" on September 27, and "End of the Dream" on Spin on October 4. All songs became available on Spin on October 7. A Renholdër remix of "Made of Stone" appears on the soundtrack and in the closing credits of the film Underworld: Awakening, and a Photek remix of "New Way to Bleed" is on The Avengers soundtrack Avengers Assemble: Music from and Inspired by the Motion Picture.

On August 8, Evanescence appeared on "MTV First: Evanescence" to introduce the album's first single, "What You Want", with a live performance and an extended interview. Lee went to Toronto's Liberty Studios on August 22 to preview five mastered songs from the new album ("What You Want", "The Change", "The Other Side", "My Heart Is Broken" and "Lost in Paradise") to a selected audience of 30. Evanescence appeared at the Rock in Rio festival on October 2, 2011, performing "What You Want", "Made of Stone", "The Change", "The Other Side", "My Heart Is Broken", "Sick" and several songs from their previous two albums. Before Evanescence US release, Lee appeared on the Billboard website on October 11 to promote the album. The band appeared on Jimmy Kimmel Live! on October 15, performing "What You Want" and "Going Under". On December 12, Evanescence appeared at the Nobel Peace Prize Concert, where they performed "Lost in Paradise" and 2003's "Bring Me to Life". On February 1, 2012, the band performed "My Heart Is Broken" on The Tonight Show with Jay Leno, and two days later they played "Made of Stone" and "The Other Side" on Conan.

Tour

Evanescence began their tour to promote the album with a concert at War Memorial Auditorium in Nashville, Tennessee, on August 17, 2011. This was followed by performances at Rock on the Range in Winnipeg on August 20, Rock in Rio on October 2 and at the José Miguel Agrelot Coliseum in Puerto Rico on October 6. The band began the first US leg of their tour on October 10 in Oakland, California, and finished it in New York City. Evanescence then played several concerts in the United Kingdom, beginning at London's Hammersmith Apollo on November 4 and finishing the leg on November 13 at the O2 Academy Birmingham. Supported by The Pretty Reckless, Fair to Midland and Rival Sons, the tour's set list included songs from Evanescence's three albums. Lee said, "We're definitely focusing mainly on the new material. We're really excited about that music the most – obviously it's the newest – but of course we'll be playing some from both of our other albums too. I guess I'd say in general, our show's on the heavy-energy side, so we'll be running around singing a lot of fast songs."

The Evanescence Tour continued in 2012 with concerts in the United States, Asia and Europe, including Lisboa V in Portugal and Rock am Ring in Germany. Their South American tour began on October 4 in Porto Alegre, Brazil, and the band returned to the UK for four shows in November. Evanescence also played on the Carnival of Madness tour with Halestorm, Cavo, New Medicine and Chevelle. That tour began on July 31, 2012, at the Prairie Capital Convention Center in Springfield, Illinois and ended on September 2 at the Outer Harbor in Buffalo, New York.

Singles
"What You Want", the album's first single, was released digitally on August 9, 2011. The song's lyrics are about freedom, one of Evanescence themes. It debuted at number one on the UK Rock Chart, making Evanescence the artist with the most number-one singles on the chart in 2011. "What You Want" peaked at numbers 68 and 72 on the Billboard Hot 100 and UK Singles Chart, respectively. Its video, filmed in a Brooklyn, New York warehouse on July 30, 2011 with the band performing the song live, was directed by Meiert Avis and released on September 13.

"My Heart Is Broken" was distributed to hot, modern and adult-contemporary radio stations on October 31, 2011 and to pop stations the following day as the album's first mainstream single. Its video was released in January 2012, and the song was distributed to alternative and modern-rock stations on February 13. The next mainstream single, "Lost in Paradise", was released internationally on May 25. Its video, released on February 14, 2013, focuses on Evanescence's tour with footage of the band performing the song filmed by fans around the world. "The Other Side" was a promotional single which was distributed to modern-rock stations on June 11 and alternative stations the following day. Although a lyric video was uploaded to the band's YouTube channel on August 30, 2012, Lee said that no other video would be made for the song.

Critical reception

Evanescence has received mostly positive reviews from music critics. Metacritic assigned an average score of 63 to the album based on nine reviews, indicating a generally favorable reception. Before its release the album appeared on several lists, including Spins "26 Fall Albums That Matter Most", Entertainment Weeklys "Fall Albums We Can't Wait to Hear" and Rolling Stones "Fall Music Preview: The Season's Hottest Albums". Steve Beebee of Kerrang! gave the album five stars out of five, calling it "easily their most cohesive and confident work" and their "best album to date". According to Rick Florino of Artistdirect, Evanescence was "their best album to date and a new classic" and "[they] manage to experiment while staying unshakably infectious. That's not an easy feat, and few acts manage to do that."

AllMusic's Stephen Thomas Erlewine praised Raskulinecz's production, Lee's vocals and the "fair share of crossover hooks", adding that the band sounded "less tortured tonally even if it remains quite dramatic." Entertainment Weekly Kyle Anderson said, "When  uses baroque orchestral accoutrements to wage an air assault on her demons ... she's more than just the token girl in the pit." Lewis Corner of Digital Spy gave the album four stars out of five, saying that the band's trademark sound was present on the album "and truth be told, we wouldn't want it any other way." Mark Lepage of the Montreal Gazette praised the album, calling it "one rolling, chugging, plangent epic." According to Chad Grischow of IGN, Evanescence is a "great album that delivers the familiar while keeping an eye on the future." Rob Williams of the Winnipeg Free Press described the album as gothic nu metal and hard rock, with dramatic orchestration which makes everything sound "big and alive": "With so many extra bells and whistles, despair has never sounded so epic." Marc Hirsh of The Boston Globe wrote that the album captures "each party elevating the other far above where their proclivities would get them on their own."

According to Nick Catucci of Rolling Stone, Evanescence is primarily a "syrupy mix of piano, guitar and strings" which is not as "saucy" as the band's older material. Chris Willman of Reuters wrote, "Every interchangeable tune on the new album also sounds designed to play over the end credits of an action blockbuster that takes itself too seriously". Theon Weber of Spin gave the album a mixed review; rather than holding back too much, Weber wrote, Lee did not do enough to restrain her performance: "Evanescence gets lost in the cavernous spaces carved out by their unsecret weapon." Edna Gundersen of USA Today criticized Raskulineczs production and the album's electronics: "Tempered,  emotional wail enhances the hypnotic medieval magic of signature Evanescence tunes. Some electronics slip into the mix, but the band's rock essence and penchant for weepy strings remain prominent, as does its flair for conveying wretched despair." Although PopMatters Dane Prokofiev criticized the album's eponymous title as a new-band strategy, he praised the "noticeable increase in the prominence of choir singing, tinkling piano motifs, and the silky sound of string instruments" with the caveat that the additional deluxe-edition songs were superior to those on the standard edition. He also noted a turn in the band's sound to match that of symphonic metal. Steven Hyden of The A.V. Club called the album "narcissistic", "corny" and "irredeemably stupid".

Commercial performance

Evanescence debuted at number one on the Billboard 200 with first-week sales of 127,000 copies, becoming the band's second album to debut atop the chart. The first week's sales were lower than those for Evanescence previous album, The Open Door, which sold 447,000 copies in its first week. The album fell to number four the following week, selling over 40,000 copies. Evanescence also topped the Digital Albums, Top Rock Albums, Alternative Albums, and Hard Rock Albums charts in the United States, and was 2011's 141st best-selling album in that country. , Evanescence had sold 421,000 copies in the US. On December 9, 2020, the album was certified gold by the Recording Industry Association of America (RIAA) for shipments of over 500,000 units.

The album sold more than 2,000 copies on its first day of sales in the United Kingdom and debuted at number four on the UK Albums Chart with 26,221 copies sold in its first week. It was certified gold by the British Phonographic Industry (BPI) on August 22, 2014, denoting shipments in excess of 100,000 copies. The album entered the Canadian Albums Chart at number two, selling 9,000 copies in its first week. On January 12, 2012, the album was certified gold by Music Canada for shipments of over 40,000 units in Canada. Evanescence debuted and peaked at number five in Australia, was certified gold by the Australian Recording Industry Association (ARIA) for shipments of over 35,000 copies.

Track listing

Personnel
Credits adapted from the liner notes of Evanescence.

Evanescence
 Amy Lee – vocals, piano, keyboards, harp
 Terry Balsamo – guitar
 Troy McLawhorn – guitar
 Tim McCord – bass
 Will Hunt – drums

Additional musicians
 Chris Vrenna – programming, additional keyboards
 William B. Hunt – additional programming on "Swimming Home"
 David Campbell – string consultant
 Antoine Silverman – concertmaster
 Maxim Moston – violin
 Claire Chan – violin
 Suzy Perelman – violin
 Michael Roth – violin
 Sarah Pratt – violin
 Hiroko Taguchi – violin, viola
 Jonathan Dinklage – violin, viola
 Entcho Todorov – violin
 Dave Eggar – cello
 Anja Wood – cello
 Claire Bryant – cello
 Pete Donovan – bass

Technical
 Nick Raskulinecz – production
 Paul Fig – engineering
 Nathan Yarborough – engineering assistance
 Randy Staub – mixing
 Zach Blackstone – mix assistance
 Ted Jensen – mastering
 Phyllis Sparks – harp technician
 Mike Simmons – guitar technician, bass technician
 John Nicholson – drum technician
 Antoine Silverman – contractor

Artwork
 Michelle Lukianovich – art direction, package design
 Amy Lee – art direction, package design
 Chapman Baehler – photography

Charts

Weekly charts

Year-end charts

Certifications

Release history

Notes

References

External links

 

2011 albums
Albums produced by Nick Raskulinecz
Evanescence albums
Wind-up Records albums